Deus Ex Machina is the first full-length album from former Leaves' Eyes frontwoman Liv Kristine. Unlike her follow-up, "Enter My Religion", she only co-wrote two songs: the title track and "In the Heart of Juliet". The song "3 am" is a duet between Liv Kristine and Nick Holmes of Paradise Lost.

It was re-issued in 2007 on Candlelight Records, with the catalog number 338.

Track listing

Personnel
Liv Kristine: All Female & "Experimental" Vocals
Gunther Illi: All Acoustic & Electric Guitars, Keyboards, Synthesizers, Piano, Bass, Synthesized Bass, Drums, Percussion, Drum Programming
Nick Holmes: Male Voice on track 4
Stefan Muller-Ruppert: Opera Vocals on track 2

Production
Produced By Gunther Illi - producer, engineer, mixing
Andy Horn - engineer
 Gunter Eckert - engineer
Dierk Budde - mixing
Alexander Krull - mastering

References

Liv Kristine; Deus Ex Machina CD Booklet; 1999 Massacre Records.

1999 debut albums
Massacre Records albums